Sigg may refer to:

 SIGG, Sigg Switzerland AG is a Swiss manufacturing company with its headquarters in Frauenfeld

Sigg is also a surname and may refer to:

Austin Sigg (born 1995), American murderer of Jessica Ridgeway
 Eugen Sigg (1898–1974), Swiss rower 
 Ferdinand Sigg (1902–1965), European bishop
 Fredy Sigg (1923–1998), Swiss designer and cartoonist
 Oswald Sigg (born 1944), Swiss journalist
 Uli Sigg (born 1946), Swiss businessman, diplomat, art collector

See also
 Sig (disambiguation)